Rebecca James may refer to:
Becky James (born 1991), Welsh cyclist
Rebecca James (author) (born 1970), Australian author
Rebecca Salsbury James (1891–1968) American artist based in Taos, New Mexico
For Rebecca James, the TV character, see List of Veronica Mars characters